Richard Gibson (16 April 1918 – 17 December 2010) was a racing driver from England. He scored no championship points. He also participated in numerous non-Championship Formula One races.

Complete Formula One World Championship results
(key)

References

English racing drivers
English Formula One drivers
1918 births
2010 deaths